Fanipal is a city in Minsk Region, Belarus.

History 
The community that became Fanipal was first mentioned in 1856. According to documents in the Central State Historical Archive of Belarus, it was the former possession of landowners named Enelpheldt and Bogdashevsky. In 1870 a railway stop opened, and in 1871 the railway stop become the Tokarevskaya railway station, named in honor of the governor of the Minsk Governorate, Vladimir Tokarev, who was also the founder of the Brest-Moscow railway. On August 9, 1876 the railway station was renamed Fanipol. In 1965 the first factory was opened, producing reinforced concrete bridge components, this is the only factory in Belarus which produces these items. Once it was established as an industrial center, it grew rapidly. On April 29, 1984, Fanipal was designated a "City Settlement" and on June 22, 1999 Fanipal was designated a regional city center. In 2006 people of Fanipal celebrated the 150th anniversary of their city.

Geography

Overview
Situated in south-western suburb of Minsk, is part of its urban area and one of its main satellite towns also with Zaslawye and Machulishi.

Districts
There are now 5 administrative districts in Fanipal:
Maladyozhny (Youth).
Severny (Northern).
Tsentralny (Midtown).
Zavadski (Factory district). District where factory workers live.
Yuzhny (Southern)
 In addition, the Industrial area is not considered as a formal district.

Education
There are three schools in Fanipol:
Fanipal School №1
Fanipal Gymnasium (formerly School №2)
Children Music School
the Fanipal City Library has 2115 members.

Transportation

Fanipal has a station on the Brest-Moscow railroad. Fanipal is situated near the M-1 (E-30) highway, which runs from Brest to Moscow through Minsk (Brest-Minsk-Moscow). Fanipal is well connected with Minsk, Dzyarzhynsk, and all of Belarus as well as other nations via the Minsk and M-1 Highways.

Industry
Fanipal's industry began in the 1960s, leading to rapid growth of the city.
 The Fanipal reinforced concrete bridge factory is unique in Belarus. It was the first factory in Fanipal, built in 1965.
 The Agrarian Cooperative "Agrokombinat Dzerzhinsky" is the largest producer in Belarus of poultry, eggs, and related products. The factory is nicknamed "The Factory of Health" and has received many domestic and foreign awards for agricultural innovation.
 CJSC Stadler Minsk is the plant owned by Stadler Rail AG (Switzerland). The plant is responsible for the production  of  broad gauge rolling stock for CIS countries.
 Other factories in Fanipol include: Unomedical (owned by Convatec, produces single-use medical devices), Enerhamera (produces counters), a gravel works, Fanipal RMP (a mechanical repair facility) and many others.

Gallery

References

External links

City of Fanipal Official Website (rus/bel)
History of Fanipal
About Fanipal Seal

Towns in Belarus
Populated places in Minsk Region
Populated places established in 1856
Dzyarzhynsk District
Minsky Uyezd